Crisscraft is a 1975 album by jazz saxophonist Sonny Criss, originally released on the Muse label, and later reissued on 32 Jazz.

Reception

AllMusic awarded the album 4½ stars with its review by Scott Yanow calling it "one of the very best Sonny Criss albums... Criss, who had not recorded as a leader in six years, was really ready for this session, making this his definitive set to get".

Track listing
 "The Isle of Celia" (Horace Tapscott) – 10:28
 "Blues in My Heart" (Benny Carter, Irving Mills) – 5:59
 "This is for Benny" (Tapscott) – 4:53
 "All Night Long" (Curtis Lewis) – 3:59
 "Crisscraft" (Sonny Criss) – 7:08

Personnel 
 Sonny Criss – alto saxophone
 Dolo Coker – piano
 Ray Crawford – guitar
 Larry Gales – bass
 Jimmie Smith – drums

References 

Sonny Criss albums
Muse Records albums
1975 albums
Albums recorded at Wally Heider Studios